Brain was a Hamburg-based record label prominent in the 1970s releasing several important Krautrock records by bands such as Neu!, Cluster and Guru Guru. Many of its more prominent records are currently being reissued on CD by Repertoire Records.

In the middle of 1971, Rolf-Ulrich Kaiser's management style at Ohr caused two of his A&R men, Bruno Wendel and Günter Körber, to leave Ohr and set up their own record company, which they called Brain. Wendel & Korber brought Guru Guru with them from Ohr, and immediately signed Cluster, who had recorded one LP for Philips; they soon recorded and released Cluster II.

Brain was rapidly a success throughout West Germany and much of western Europe, although had little presence in the US. Signings throughout the seventies and into the eighties included Neu!, Cluster, Harmonia, Klaus Schulze, Edgar Froese, Guru Guru, Grobschnitt, Novalis, Jane, Birth Control, Embryo, Popol Vuh, Curly Curve, Scorpions, Electric Sun, Accept and many more.

A later reissue series called Rock On Brain saw many early Brain recordings reissued, although mostly with entirely different sleeves and even album titles. Brain also reissued a number of recordings licensed to their parent company Metronome, such as Amon Düül's first album Psychedelic Underground. Many came out on the M2001 label which is closely linked to Brain.

Brain licensed and issued a number of British releases for the West German market, in this case mainly featuring the original sleeves. These included Greenslade, Caravan, If, Spirogyra, Atomic Rooster, Alexis Korner, Gryphon and Steamhammer. There were of course exceptions - the Brain issue of Atomic Rooster's Nice n Greasy features an entirely different sleeve to the UK issue, and If's Double Diamond didn't receive a UK release at all.

Some Brain releases later proved highly influential. Brain 1004 was Neu!'s eponymous debut Neu!; Brain 1062 was Neu! 75, which undoubtedly contributed to the sound of punk rock.

Körber left in 1976 to start Sky Records, which released much Cluster-related music plus Michael Rother's early solo work, and bands like Streetmark. When he left the labels of Brain LPs changed from green to orange.

Discography

1001 – Scorpions – Lonesome Crow
1002 – Jane – Together
1003 – Gomorrha – I turned to See Whose Voice It Was
1004 – Neu! – Neu!
1005 – Spirogyra – St. Radigunds – licensed release (UK: B & C, 1042)
1006 – Cluster – Cluster II
1007 – Guru Guru – Känguru
1008 – Grobschnitt – Grobschnitt
1009 – Steamhammer – Speech – licensed release (non German band)
1010 – Caravan – Waterloo Lily – licensed release (UK: Deram, SDL 8)
1011 – Atomic Rooster – Made in England – licensed release (UK: Dawn, DNLS 3038)
1012 – Spirogyra – Old Boot Wine – licensed release (UK: Pegasus, 13)
1013 – Light – Story of Moses
1014 – Gash – A Young Man's Gash
1015 – Os Mundi – 43 Minuten
1016 – Wolfgang Dauner Group – Rischka's Soul
1017 – Creative Rock – Gorilla
1018 – Electric Sandwich – Electric Sandwich
1019 – Khan – Space Shanty – licensed release (UK: Deram, SLDR 11)
1020 – Sameti – Sameti
1021 – Thirsty Moon – Thirsty Moon
1022 – Alexis Korner – Korner & Snape – licensed release (US: WB, BS 2647)
1023 – Embryo – Steig Aus
1024 – Spirogyra – Bells, Boots and Shambles – licensed release (UK: Polydor, 2310 246)
1025 – Guru Guru – Guru Guru
1026 – Spermüll – Spermüll
1027 – Greenslade – Greenslade – licensed release (UK: WB, K 46207)
1028 – Neu! – Neu! 2
1029 – Novalis – Banished Bridge
1030 – Cornucopia – Full Horn
1031 – Lava – Tears are going home
1032 – Jane – Here we are
1033 – Atomic Rooster – Nice 'n' Greasy – licensed release (non German band)
1034 – Kollektiv – Kollektiv
1035 – if – Double Diamond – licensed release (Canada: GRT, 9230-1032)
1036 – Embryo – Rocksession
1037 – Emergency – Get Out of the Country
1038 – Caravan – For Girls Who Grow Plump in the Night – licensed release (UK: Deram, SKLR 12)
1039 – Alexis Korner & Snape – Live on Tour in Germany (2LP) – licensed release (non German band)?
1040 – Curly Curve – Curly Curve
1041 – Thirsty Moon – You'll never Come Back
1042 – Greenslade – Bedside Manners are Extra – licensed release (UK: WB, K46259)
1043 – Steamhammer – This is... (2LP)
1044 – Harmonia – Musik von Harmonia
1045 – Yatha Sidra – A Meditation Mass
1046 – Various – Krautrock (3LP)
1047 – Zabba Lindner & Carsten Bohn – Vollbedienung Of Percussion
1048 – Jane – Jane III
1049 – Satin Whale – Desert Places
1050 – Grobschnitt – Ballermann (2LP)
1051 – Klaus Schulze – Black Dance
1052 – Emergency – No Compromise
1053 – Edgar Froese – Aqua
1054 – Caravan – Caravan and the New Symphonia – licensed release (UK: Deram, SKLR 1110)
1055 – If – Not just another Bunch of Pretty Faces – licensed release (UK: Gull, 1004)
1056 – Release Music Orchestra – Life
1057 – Guru Guru – Der Electrolurch (2LP) – Reissue of Känguru (1007) and Guru Guru (1025)
1058 – Tasavallan Presidentti – Milky Way Moses – licensed release (Finland/UK: Sonet, SNTF 658)
1059 – Jukka Tolonen – Tolonen! – licensed release (Finland: Love, LRLP 47)
1060 – Hardcake Special – Hardcake Special
1061 – Creative Rock – Lady Pig
1062 – Neu! – Neu 75
1063 – Tasavallan Presidentti – Lambert Land – licensed release (Finland/UK: Sonet, SNTF 636)
1064 – If – Tea Break Over Back – licensed release (UK: Gull, 1007)
1065 – Cluster – Zuckerzeit
1066 – Jane – Lady Jane
1067 – Klaus Schulze – Picture Music
1068 – Achim Reichel – Erholung
1069 – Eroc – Eroc
1070 – Novalis – Novalis
1071 – Gryphon – Red Queen to Gryphon Three – licensed release (UK: Transatlantic, TRA 287)
1072 – Release Music Orchestra – Garuda
1073 – Harmonia – De Luxe
1074 – Edgar Froese – Epsilon in Malaysian Pale
1075 – Klaus Schulze – Time Wind
1076 – Grobschnitt – Jumbo (version en Ingles)
1077 – Klaus Schulze – Irrlicht
1078 – Klaus Schulze – Cyborg (2LP) – reissue (Kosmische Musik, KM2/58.005)
1079 – Thirsty Moon – Blitz
1080 – Günter Schickert – Samtvogel – reissue (Sch 33003)
1081 – Grobschnitt – Jumbo (version en Aleman)
1082 – Tangerine Dream – Alpha Centauri/Atem (2LP) – reissue (Ohr, OMM12 & OMM31)
1083 – Release Music Orchestra – Get the Ball
1084 – Jane – Fire, Water, Earth & Air
1085 – Locomotiv GT – Mindig Magasabra – licensed release (non German band)
1086 – Tangerine Dream – Zeit (2LP) – reissue (Ohr, OMM21)
1087 – Novalis – Sommerabend
1088 – Klaus Schulze – Moondawn
1089 – Guru Guru – Tango Fango
1091 – Various – Brain history of German Rock (2LP)

60.000 – series
60.007 – Eroc – Zwei
60.008 – Edgar Froese – Macula Transfer
60.009 – Thirsty Moon – A Real Good Time
60.010 – Schicke, Führs & Fröhling (SFF) – Symphonic Pictures
60.019 – Birth Control – Backdoor Possibilities
60.031 – Ruphus – Let Your Light Shine
60.000 – serie (en Brain naranja)
60.039 – Guru Guru – Globetrotter
60.040 – Klaus Schulze – Mirage
60.041 – Grobschnitt – Rockpommel's Land
60.042 – Gate – Live
60.047 – Klaus Schulze – Body Love
60.053 – To Be – To Be
60.055 – Jane – Between Heaven and Hell
60.065 – Novalis – Konzerte
60.066 – Birth Control – Increase
60.068 – Schicke, Führs & Fröhling (SFF) – Sunburst
60.078 – Message – Using the Head
60.079 – Popol Vuh – Herz aus Glas
60.093 – Gate – Red Light Sister
60.094 – Novalis – Brandung
60.097 – Klaus Schulze – Body Love Vol.2
60.104 – Blonker – Die Zeit Steht Still
60.105 – Führs & Fröhling – Ammerland
60.115 – Release Music Orchestra – Beyond the Limit
60.117 – Liliental – Liliental
60.120 – Zeus B. Held – Zeus' Amusement
60.124 – Jane – Age of Madness
60.139 – Grobschnitt – Solar Music Live
60.149 – Birth Control – Titanic
60.164 – Novalis – Vielleicht Bist Du Ein Clown?
60.165 – Message – Astral Journeys
60.167 – Popol Vuh – Brüder des Schattens - Söhne des Lichts
60.173 – Schicke, Führs & Fröhling (SFF) – Ticket to Everywhere
60.185 – Epitaph – Return to Reality
60.186 – Anyone's Daughter – Adonis
60.187 – Guru Guru Sunband – Hey Du!
60.188 – Accept – Accept
60.194 – Release Music Orchestra – News
60.196 – Electric Sun – Earthquake
60.197 – Eroc – Eroc3
60.218 – Jane – Sign No. 9
60.219 – Novalis – Wer Schmetterlinge Lachen Hort (compilation)
60.223 – Führs & Fröhling – Strings
60.224 – Grobschnitt – Merry Go Round
60.225 – Klaus Schulze – Dune
60.240 – Birth Control – Live '79
60.242 – Popol Vuh – Die Nacht der Seele
60.274 – Epitaph – See You In Alaska 
60.291 – Grobschnitt – Volle Molle
60.000 – serie (en Brain negro)
60.353 – Klaus Schulze – Dig It
60.354 – Jane – Jane
60.365 – Grobschnitt – Ilegal
60.385 – Epitaph – Live
60.397 – Scorpions – Lonesome Crow (reissue)
60.510 – Grobschnitt – Razzia
60.519 – Jane – Germania

80.000 – series
80.001 – Jane – Live at home
80.013 – Various (Jane, Novalis, etc.) – Brain Festival Essen
80.014 – Neu! – 2 Originals – Reissue Neu! (1004) and Neu!2 (1028)
80.017 – Various (Novalis, SFF, etc.) – Brain Festival Essen 2
80.018 – Guru Guru – Live
80.023 – Klaus Schulze – X
80.048 – Klaus Schulze – Live

200.100 – series
200.145 – Guru Guru – This Is Guru Guru
200.146 – Amon Düül – This Is Amon Duul
200.148 – Julie Driscoll – This Is Julie Driscoll
200.149 – Brian Auger – This Is Brian Auger
200.150 – Wolfgang Dauner – This Is Wolfgang Dauner
200.151 – Atomic Rooster – This Is Atomic Rooster
200.164 – Caravan – This Is Caravan

Albums Sampler
201.035 – Various (neu, guru guru, release music orchestra, emergence, cluster, grobschnitt, jane, hardcake special) – German Super Rock 
888 – Various (Neu, Kollektiv, etc.) – German Rock Scene – 1973

See also 
 List of record labels
 List of electronic music record labels

References

External links
 www.discogs.com/label/Brain
 https://web.archive.org/web/20080616022139/http://www.furious.com/perfect/brainrecords.html

German record labels
Rock record labels
Electronic music record labels
Record labels established in 1972